The Oberon railway station is a heritage-listed railway station and now museum located on the Oberon railway line in Oberon, in the Oberon Shire local government area of New South Wales, Australia. The site is also known as the Oberon Railway Station group. The property was added to the New South Wales State Heritage Register on 2 April 1999.

Description 
The complex comprises a type 12 pre-cast concrete station building, erected in 1923; a pre-cast concrete water closet, erected in 1923; timber platform faces, completed in 1923; and signs and artefacts, completed in 1923.

Heritage listing 
The Oberon railway station is a good example of a pre cast concrete building on a small timber faced platform that is an important part of the town of Oberon.

The Oberon railway station was listed on the New South Wales State Heritage Register on 2 April 1999 having satisfied the following criteria.

The place possesses uncommon, rare or endangered aspects of the cultural or natural history of New South Wales.

This item is assessed as historically rare. This item is assessed as archaeologically rare. This item is assessed as socially rare.

See also 

List of disused regional railway stations in New South Wales

References

Bibliography

Attribution 

Railway stations in Australia opened in 1923
Articles incorporating text from the New South Wales State Heritage Register
Disused regional railway stations in New South Wales
Museums in New South Wales
Oberon Council
New South Wales State Heritage Register